Jordi Tarrés Páramo (alternately Jorge Tarrés Páramo, ; born 16 March 1981) is a former footballer who played as a forward, and is currently the assistant coach of Hong Kong Premier League club Lee Man.

He spent most of his professional career with Kitchee in Hong Kong after signing in 2010, eventually going on to represent that national team in 2017. He amassed Segunda División B totals of 203 games and 44 goals over the course of eight seasons, during his spell in his native Spain.

Club career

Spain
Tarrés was born in Barcelona, Catalonia to Isidoro Tarrés, a footballer who played FC Barcelona and amongst other clubs. The son was a youth product of Espanyol and also appeared for its reserves in the third level, mostly representing teams in his native region.

In his country, Tarrés never competed in higher than Segunda División B, starting off with Igualada in Tercera División. In the former tier he played with Sabadell, Hércules, Terrassa and Lorca Deportiva.

Kitchee
Tarrés signed for Kitchee on 26 July 2010, being the second Spaniard to join the Hong Kong side after Fernando Recio. In his first season the club won the First Division League after 47 years, and he was also crowned the league's top scorer alongside Makhosonke Bhengu of Fourway Athletics. He also scored four goals in the 2012 AFC Cup group stage to help the team win the group, and progress to the last-16 stage of the tournament.

On 1 May 2013, Tarrés scored a hat-trick against Warriors to become top scorer in the 2013 AFC Cup group stage with ten goals, finding the net in at all group stage games and equalling Julius Akosah's record for a Hong Kong club in the same competition. The following day, Kitchee general manager Ken Ng confirmed that he had signed a new two-year contract with the club.

From 2016 to 2018, Tarrés served season-long loans at fellow Premier League sides Rangers and Lee Man. On 9 January 2018, he was recalled by Kitchee ahead of their 2018 AFC Champions League campaign.

On 25 May 2019, it was announced that the 38-year-old Tarrés would be leaving the Mong Kok Stadium after nine years.

Lee Man
Tarrés returned to Lee Man on 19 July 2019, rejoining the club after his previous loan stint. On 11 October 2020, having become a UEFA Pro Licence holder, he announced his retirement and was named their assistant coach.

International career
Tarrés received his Hong Kong passport in October 2017, at the age of 36, alongside compatriots Dani Cancela and Fernando Recio. He made his debut for the national team on 5 October, scoring one goal in a 4–0 friendly win over Laos.

Career statistics

Club

International

International goals
(Hong Kong score listed first, score column indicates score after each Tarrés goal)

Honours
Kitchee
Hong Kong Premier League: 2014–15, 2017–18
Hong Kong First Division: 2010–11, 2011–12, 2013–14
Hong Kong Senior Shield: 2018–19
Hong Kong FA Cup: 2011–12, 2012–13, 2017–18, 2018–19
Hong Kong Sapling Cup: 2017–18
Hong Kong League Cup: 2011–12

Individual
Hong Kong First Division Golden Boot: 2010–11
Hong Kong First Division Team of the Year: 2010–11, 2011–12, 2012–13
Hong Kong First Division Player of the Month: January 2012, May 2012, May 2013

References

External links

1981 births
Living people
Spanish emigrants to Hong Kong
Footballers from Barcelona
Spanish footballers
Hong Kong footballers
Naturalized footballers of Hong Kong
Association football forwards
Segunda División B players
Tercera División players
RCD Espanyol B footballers
UE Cornellà players
CE Sabadell FC footballers
Hércules CF players
Terrassa FC footballers
Lorca Deportiva CF footballers
CE L'Hospitalet players
Hong Kong First Division League players
Hong Kong Premier League players
Kitchee SC players
Hong Kong Rangers FC players
Lee Man FC players
Hong Kong League XI representative players
Hong Kong international footballers
Footballers at the 2018 Asian Games
Asian Games competitors for Hong Kong
Catalonia international footballers
Spanish expatriate footballers
Expatriate footballers in Hong Kong
Spanish expatriate sportspeople in Hong Kong